Jimmy Sheirgill (born Jasjit Singh Gill; 3 December 1970), also credited as Jimmy Shergill, is an Indian actor and film producer who works in Hindi and Punjabi films.

Sheirgill began his film career with the 1996 thriller Maachis. His breakthrough came  with the blockbuster musical romantic drama Mohabbatein (2000), which became the highest-grossing Bollywood film of the year, following which he starred in several other box-office hits including Mere Yaar Ki Shaadi Hai (2002), Munna Bhai M.B.B.S. (2003), Hum Tum (2004), A Wednesday! (2008), Tanu Weds Manu (2011), Special 26 (2013), Happy Bhag Jayegi (2016) and De De Pyaar De (2019). His highest-grossing releases came with the comedy-drama Lage Raho Munna Bhai (2006), the drama film My Name Is Khan (2010) and the romantic comedy Tanu Weds Manu: Returns (2015), all of which rank among the highest-grossing Indian films of all time. The latter earned him a nomination for the Filmfare Award for Best Supporting Actor.

Sheirgill made his Punjabi film debut with Yaaran Naal Baharan in 2005. His notable work in Punjabi cinema include Mel Karade Rabba (2010), Dharti (2011), Aa Gaye Munde U.K. De (2014), Shareek (2015) and Daana Paani (2018).

Early life
Jimmy Sheirgill was born into a Jat family of Punjabi Sikh aristocracy, and his paternal great aunt was the famous Indian painter Amrita Sher-Gil.

He studied at St. Francis' College, Lucknow for a few years and then moved to his ancestral home state of Punjab, in 1985. He studied at The Punjab Public School, Nabha and at Bikram College, Punjabi University, Patiala. He completed his graduation degree from Post Graduate Government College - 11, Chandigarh and Panjab University.

He went to Mumbai after a cousin convinced him to try his luck in the film industry. There, he attended Roshan Taneja's acting classes.

Career

Hindi films
Sheirgill started his acting career in 1996 with the critically acclaimed film Maachis, directed by Gulzar, based on the terrorism in Punjab. The film did reasonably well at the box office and got him noticed by all the top filmmakers in the industry, which led him to being cast in Aditya Chopra's Mohabbatein alongside stalwarts like Amitabh Bachchan, Shah Rukh Khan, and Aishwarya Rai. He has consistently won rave reviews for all his performances in films such as Mere Yaar Ki Shaadi Hai (2002), Dil Hai Tumhaara (2002), Haasil (2003), Munna Bhai M.B.B.S. (2003), Yahaan (2005), Lage Raho Munna Bhai (2006), Eklavya: The Royal Guard (2007), A Wednesday! (2008), My Name Is Khan (2010), Tanu Weds Manu (2011), Saheb, Biwi Aur Gangster (2011), Saheb, Biwi Aur Gangster Returns (2013), Special 26 (2013), Bullett Raja (2013), Fugly (2014) and Tanu Weds Manu: Returns (2015). He also worked with rising star of the time Amisha Patel in Yeh Zindagi Ka Safar (2001). He won the Star Guild Awards previously known as Apsara guild awards for Best Actor In A Supporting Role for a movie A Wednesday!

Punjabi films
He started acting in Punjabi films in 2005 with Manmohan Singh's Yaaran Naal Baharan, which did well at the box office. He went on to act in several other Punjabi films. He is currently one of the top actors in the industry, and some of the films he has acted in have been hits. He plans to produce and act in one Punjabi film every year, for which he has signed a deal with Bollywood production house Eros International. His first film as a producer, Dharti, released in 2011 and did well at the box office. The next production from his company was Taur Mittran Di, that was released in May 2012. He has lined up two more films for production; the multi-star cast Saadi Love Story, in which he's cast Diljit Dosanjh, Amrinder Gill, Neetu Singh, Surveen Chawla and himself in a cameo and another film titled Rangeelay, which casts him in the lead with Neha Dhupia.

Personal life 

Sheirgill married his long time girlfriend Priyanka in 2001. They have a son named Veer.

He changed the spelling of his surname "Shergill" to Sheirgill because the name Jimmy Shergill was already used on social media.

Filmography

Hindi

Punjabi

Producer

Television

References

External links

Male actors in Hindi cinema
Indian male film actors
1970 births
Living people
Punjabi people
Punjabi University alumni
People from Gorakhpur
People from Uttar Pradesh
Male actors in Punjabi cinema
21st-century Indian male actors
Indian Sikhs
Indian male voice actors